Agata Forkasiewicz (born 13 January 1994) is a Polish sprinter. She competed at the 2015 World Championships in Athletics and 2016 IAAF World Indoor Championships.

Competition record

1Disqualified in the final

Personal bests
Outdoor
100 metres – 11.46 (+0.4 m/s, Kraków 2016)
200 metres – 23.53 (+0.9 m/s, Amsterdam 2016)
Indoor
60 metres – 7.28 (Toruń 2017)
200 metres – 23.63 (Toruń 2016)

References

External links
 
 Agata Forkasiewicz at the European Athletic Association
 Agata Forkasiewicz at the Polski Związek Lekkiej Atletyki  (English translation)
 
 

1994 births
Living people
Polish female sprinters
World Athletics Championships athletes for Poland
Sportspeople from Wrocław
Universiade medalists in athletics (track and field)
Universiade silver medalists for Poland
Competitors at the 2019 Summer Universiade
Medalists at the 2017 Summer Universiade